Jozsef Borsos (21 December 1821, in Veszprém – 19 August 1883, in Budapest) was a Hungarian portrait painter and photographer; best known for his genre paintings in the Biedermeier style.

Life and work
His father,  was a lawyer, editor and publisher. From 1837, he was a student of the religious artist, in Budapest. He transferred to the Academy of Fine Arts, Vienna in 1840, where he studied with Leopold Kupelwieser. In 1843, he changed schools again, attending a private academy operated by Ferdinand Georg Waldmüller.

He initially chose to live in Vienna, with a large clientele from the Austrian aristocracy. Financially successful, he lost most of his money speculating in the stock market, and returned to Budapest in 1861. Once again, he was able to accumulate a considerable fortune, but gave up photography and opened a restaurant, the "Szép Juhászné", which he ran for the rest of his life.

Many of his works are in private collections, but some may be seen at the Hungarian National Gallery.

Sources
 Biographical notes @ Fine Arts in Hungary
 Szabó Júlia: A XIX.század festészete Magyarországon, Corvina Kiadó, 1985, 
 Seregélyi György: Magyar festők és grafikusok adattára, Szeged, 1988, 
 Szvoboda Dománszky Gabriella: A magyar biedermeier (Stílusok-korszakok sorozat), Corvina Kiadó, 2011,

External links

 More works by Borsos @ ArtNet
 Works by Borsos @ Fine Arts in Hungary

1821 births
1883 deaths
19th-century Hungarian painters
Hungarian male painters
People from Veszprém
19th-century Hungarian male artists